Ronisia ghilianii is a species of wasp belonging to the family Mutillidae.

Females of Ronisia barbarula and Ronisia ghilianii look very similar, but the white hair spot on the head is roundish in ghilianii but distinctly triangular in barbarula.

References

External links 

 Ronisia ghilianii - Biodiversity Heritage Library.
 Ronisia ghilianii - NCBI Taxonomy Database.
 Ronisia ghilianii - Global Biodiversity Information Facility
 Ronisia ghilianii - Encyclopedia of Life

Mutillidae
Insects described in 1843